Tomáš Cakl (born 25 April 1981) is a professional male tennis player from the Czech Republic. He turned pro in 2000, and reached a career high singles ranking of No. 142 in February 2006. He's mostly been playing challenger tournaments.

Performance timeline

Singles

ATP Challenger and ITF Futures Finals

Singles: 12 (3–9)

Doubles: 5 (2–3)

External links
 
 

1981 births
Living people
People from Ledeč nad Sázavou
Czech male tennis players
Sportspeople from the Vysočina Region